Rudolph "Rudy" Wurlitzer (born January 3, 1937) is an American novelist and screenwriter.

Wurlitzer's fiction includes Nog, Flats, Quake, Slow Fade, and Drop Edge of Yonder. He is also the author of the travel memoir, Hard Travel to Sacred Places, an account of his spiritual journey through Asia after the death of his wife Lynn Davis's 21-year-old son.

Biography

Wurlitzer was born in Cincinnati, Ohio, but the family moved to New York City shortly after his birth. He is a descendant of Rudolph Wurlitzer (1831–1914), founder of the jukebox company of the same name, but the family fortune had long since been diminished by the time Wurlitzer came of age in the 1950s. When he was 17, he found work on an oil tanker and it was on this first trip he began to write. He spent time at Columbia University and in the Army, and continued to travel, spending time in Paris, and on Majorca where he worked as a secretary for author Robert Graves. He credits Graves with teaching him how to "write short sentences."  He returned to New York City in the mid 1960s where he met and befriended the artists Claes Oldenburg, Robert Frank, and Philip Glass, all of whom he collaborated with at some point. He is married to photographer Lynn Davis and splits his time between homes in upstate New York and Nova Scotia.

Novels

Wurlitzer's first novel was the highly experimental and psychedelic Nog (1969) which was compared to the work of Thomas Pynchon. It was followed by the minimalist, Beckett-influenced Flats in 1970. Quake, published in 1974, takes place in a post-apocalyptic Los Angeles where mankind's worst impulses are acted out in one long, unbroken narrative. 1984's Slow Fade, also dealing with Hollywood, is a portrait of an aging, once-brilliant film director attempting to make peace with his demons and his past. It has been suggested that Slow Fade was influenced by Wurlitzer's time with director Sam Peckinpah on the set of Pat Garrett & Billy the Kid, for which he wrote the screenplay. His most recent novel is The Drop Edge Of Yonder, which had its origins in a screenplay called Zebulon that had existed in various versions over the years. Directors Peckinpah, and Hal Ashby were attached to the project at some point, but the film was never made.

Screenplays and other work

Wurlitzer's first script Glen and Randa, co-written with Jim McBride and released in 1969, was another take on a post-apocalyptic world.  At some point, Monte Hellman, who had been directing films for Roger Corman read Wurlitzer's novel Nog and approached him about writing the screenplay for Two-Lane Blacktop. The film became a cult-classic, and the script was printed in its entirety in the April 1971 issue of Esquire. During his time in Hollywood, Wurlitzer also wrote the screenplays Walker (1987) directed by Alex Cox, Candy Mountain (1988) which he co-directed with Robert Frank, and Little Buddha (1993) directed by Bernardo Bertolucci. Wurlitzer was working on a script with Michelangelo Antonioni at the time of Antonioni's death.

He wrote the libretto for Philip Glass's opera In the Penal Colony, and has also written four television scripts for 100 Centre Street, directed by Sidney Lumet.

Filmography
Glen and Randa (co-written with Jim McBride) (1969, Writer)
Two-Lane Blacktop  (directed by Monte Hellman) (1971, Writer) - Hot Rod Driver
Pat Garrett and Billy the Kid (directed by Sam Peckinpah) (1973, Writer) - O'Folliard
America (directed by Robert Downey Sr.) (1986) - George, the Hit Man
Walker (directed by Alex Cox) (1987, Writer) - Morgan
Candy Mountain (co-directed with Robert Frank) (1988, Writer/co-director)
Homo Faber (aka Voyager) (directed by Volker Schlöndorff) (1991, Writer)
Wind (directed by Carroll Ballard) (1992, Writer)
Little Buddha (directed by Bernardo Bertolucci) (1993, Writer)

Publications

Nog, published 1968 by Random House; reissued in 2009 by Two Dollar Radio 
Flats, published 1971 by Random House, reissued in 2009 by Two Dollar Radio
Quake, published 1974 by E. P. Dutton, reissued in 2009 by Two Dollar Radio
Slow Fade, published 1984 by Alfred A. Knopf, reissued in 2011 by Drag City
Hard Travel to Sacred Places, published 1995 by Random House
The Drop Edge of Yonder, published 2008 by Two Dollar Radio

References

External links
 
 Vertigo magazine interview
 "Rudy Wurlitzer In Conversation with Theodore Hamm" The Brooklyn Rail, (Dec 09 - Jan 10)
 Conversing with Rudy Wurlitzer: A Beaten-Up Old Scribbler, Pop Matters
 Rudy Wurlitzer, Bob Dylan, Bloody Sam, and the Jornado del Muerto, Pop Matters
 Scott McClanahan Interviews Rudolph Wurlitzer, Ain't It Cool News

21st-century American novelists
American male novelists
American male screenwriters
American television writers
Columbia University alumni
Living people
1937 births
Wurlitzer
American opera librettists
Writers from Cincinnati
Writers from New York City
American male television writers
21st-century American male writers
Novelists from New York (state)
Novelists from Ohio
Screenwriters from New York (state)
Screenwriters from Ohio
21st-century American screenwriters